Jan van der Rassel (born 5 January 1964) is a former Dutch professional darts player. He used the nicknames The Project and Rassel Dazzle for his matches.

Career

He began his darts career competing on the BDO circuit in 2002, and reached the quarter finals of the Dutch Open in 2003. After reaching the last 16 of the Winmau World Masters in 2003, he switched the rival organisation, the PDC and made his World Championship debut in 2004 but lost his opening match to Ritchie Buckle. He then began competing on the PDC Pro Tour circuit (non-televised events). His best results came in his native Netherlands – reaching the semi-finals of the 2005 Open Hotel Zwartewater and the quarter-finals of the 2005 Dutch Open, which he was still eligible despite being a PDC player.  

After failing to qualify for the 2005 PDC World Championship he returned to the event in 2006 beating former world champion Steve Beaton in the first round before losing narrowly to American John Kuczynski 3–4 in the second round. 

In November 2006, Van der Rassel won his first title – the Primus Masters, although the top players in the PDC were absent in the event he beat England's Andy Smith, four fellow Dutchman and two Belgians on his way to the title. Just a week later, he failed to progress to the 2007 World Championship losing to Steve Evans in the qualifiers.

Van der Rassel competed in fewer Pro Tour events during 2007, choosing to enter the tournaments closer to his home country – including the Antwerp Darts Trophy where he lost to James Wade in the last 32. He progressed through the qualifying tournament for the 2008 World Championship having to win four matches to make it to the Alexandra Palace tournament. He managed to beat former world number one Colin Lloyd in the first round and Denis Ovens in the second round before losing to three-time World Championship runner-up Peter Manley in the last 16.

In the 2009 PDC World Darts Championship, he defeated 2008 finalist Kirk Shepherd in the first round in a narrow 3–2 win and faced fellow Dutchman Jelle Klaasen in the second round and lost 4–0.

Van der Rassel rejoined the British Darts Organisation in 2010 due to lack of sponsorship funds. And stopped playing in 2012.

Van der Rassel Quit the BDO in 2014.

World Championship performances

PDC

 2004: 1st Round (lost to Ritchie Buckle 1–3)
 2006: 2nd Round (lost to John Kuczynski 3–4)
 2008: 3rd Round (lost to Peter Manley 1–4)
 2009: 2nd Round (lost to Jelle Klaasen 0–4)
 2010: 1st Round (lost to Denis Ovens 1–3)

External links
Van der Rassel's darts database
Van der Rassel at darts-web.eu

1964 births
Living people
Dutch darts players
Sportspeople from The Hague
Professional Darts Corporation former pro tour players
British Darts Organisation players